Cancer of the prostate is the second most common cancerous tumor worldwide and is the fifth leading cause of cancer-related mortality among men. The prostate is a gland in the male reproductive system that surrounds the urethra just below the bladder. It is located in the hypogastric region of the abdomen. To give an idea of where it is located, the bladder is superior to the prostate gland as shown in the image The rectum is posterior in perspective to the prostate gland and the ischial tuberosity of the pelvic bone is inferior. Most prostate cancers are slow growing. Cancerous cells may spread to other areas of the body, particularly the bones and lymph nodes. It may initially cause no symptoms. In later stages, symptoms include pain or difficulty urinating, blood in the urine, or pain in the pelvis or back. Benign prostatic hyperplasia may produce similar symptoms. Other late symptoms include fatigue, due to low levels of red blood cells.

Factors that increase the risk of prostate cancer include older age, family history and race. About 99% of cases occur after age 50. A first-degree relative with the disease increases the risk two- to three-fold. Other factors include a diet high in processed meat and red meat, while the risk from a high intake of milk products is inconclusive. An association with gonorrhea has been found, although no reason for this relationship has been identified. An increased risk is associated with the BRCA mutations. Diagnosis is by biopsy. Medical imaging may be done to assess whether metastasis is present.

Prostate cancer screening, including prostate-specific antigen (PSA) testing, increases cancer detection but whether it improves outcomes is controversial. Informed decision making is recommended for those 55 to 69 years old. Testing, if carried out, is more appropriate for those with a longer life expectancy. Although 5α-reductase inhibitors appear to decrease low-grade cancer risk, they do not affect high-grade cancer risk, and are not recommended for prevention. Vitamin or mineral supplementation does not appear to affect risk.

Many cases are managed with active surveillance or watchful waiting. Other treatments may include a combination of surgery, radiation therapy, hormone therapy, or chemotherapy. Tumors limited to the prostate may be curable. Pain medications, bisphosphonates, and targeted therapy, among others, may be useful. Outcomes depend on age, health status and how aggressive and extensive the cancer is. Most men with prostate cancer do not die from it. The United States five-year survival rate is 98%.

Globally, it is the second-most common cancer. It is the fifth-leading cause of cancer-related death in men. In 2018, it was diagnosed in 1.2 million and caused 359,000 deaths. It was the most common cancer in males in 84 countries, occurring more commonly in the developed world. Rates have been increasing in the developing world. Detection increased significantly in the 1980s and 1990s in many areas due to increased PSA testing. One study reported prostate cancer in 30% to 70% of Russian and Japanese men over age 60 who had died of unrelated causes.

Signs and symptoms

Early prostate cancer usually has no clear symptoms. When they do appear, they are often similar to those of benign prostatic hyperplasia. These include frequent urination, nocturia (increased urination at night), difficulty starting and maintaining a steady stream of urine, hematuria (blood in the urine), dysuria (painful urination) as well as fatigue due to anemia, and bone pain. One study found that about a third of diagnosed patients had one or more such symptoms.

Prostate cancer is associated with urinary dysfunction as the prostate gland surrounds the prostatic urethra. Changes within the gland directly affect urinary function. Because the vas deferens deposits seminal fluid into the prostatic urethra, and secretions from the prostate are included in semen content, prostate cancer may also cause problems with sexual function and performance, such as difficulty achieving erection or painful ejaculation.

Metastatic prostate cancer can cause additional symptoms. The most common symptom is bone pain, often in the vertebrae (bones of the spine), pelvis, or ribs. Spread of cancer into other bones such as the femur is usually to the part of the bone nearer to the prostate. Prostate cancer in the spine can compress the spinal cord, causing tingling, leg weakness, and urinary and fecal incontinence.

Risk factors
The primary risk factors are obesity, age, and family history. Obese men have been found to have a 34% greater death rate from prostate cancer than those with normal weight. Prostate cancer is uncommon in men younger than 45, but becomes more common with advancing age. The average age at the time of diagnosis is 70. Autopsy studies of Chinese, German, Israeli, Jamaican, Swedish, and Ugandan men who died of other causes found prostate cancer in 30% of men in their 50s, and in 80% of men in their 70s.

Men with high blood pressure are more likely to develop prostate cancer. A small increase in risk is associated with lack of exercise. Elevated blood testosterone levels may increase risk.

Genetics
Genetics may affect risk, as suggested by associations with race, family, and specific gene variants. Men who have a first-degree relative (father or brother) with prostate cancer have twice the risk of developing prostate cancer, and those with two first-degree relatives affected have a five-fold greater risk compared with men with no family history. This risk appears to be greater for men with an affected brother than for those with an affected father. In the United States, prostate cancer more commonly affects black men than white or Hispanic men, and is also more deadly in black men. In contrast, the incidence and mortality rates for Hispanic men are one-third lower than for non-Hispanic whites. Twin studies in Scandinavia suggest that 58% of prostate cancer risk can be explained by inherited factors.

Many genes are involved in inherited risk for prostate cancer. The first gene linked to inherited prostate cancer in families was hereditary prostate cancer gene 1 (HPC1). Mutations within the HOXB13 gene can also carry strong risk for prostate cancer. Inherited genetic variation of the chromosome 8q24 locus, one that is prominently observed through genome-wide association study (GWAS) of both familial and sporadic prostate cancer, can carry near-Mendelian (up to 20-fold) risk for prostate cancer. This region encompasses regulatory elements, non-coding genes, and the stem cell related POU5F1B gene. Roughly 4% of families in which multiple men are affected by prostate cancer carry mutations in HOXB13, and another 4% carry mutations at 8q24. Mutations in BRCA1 and BRCA2 (important risk factors for ovarian cancer and breast cancer in women) have also been implicated.

Two large GWAS discovered common low-risk single-nucleotide polymorphisms (SNPs) that are associated with prostate cancer in 2008. These studies identified several relevant SNPs. For example, individuals with TT allele pair at SNP rs10993994 were reported to be at 1.6 times higher risk than those with the CC allele pair. This SNP explains part of the increased risk faced by African-Americans. The C allele is much more prevalent in the latter; this SNP is located in the promoter region of the MSMB gene, thus affects the amount of MSMB protein synthesized and secreted by epithelial cells of the prostate.

While fewer studies have been conducted assessing the risk of being diagnosed with aggressive prostate cancer, a GWAS of 12,518 prostate cancer cases identified two loci associated with high Gleason sum score, SNP rs78943174 nearest to the gene NAALADL2 and SNP rs35148638 nearest to RASA1.

A number of somatic mutations (acquired rather than inherited) have also been defined in prostate tumors that drive their growth.  TMPRSS2-ETS gene family fusion, specifically TMPRSS2-ERG or TMPRSS2-ETV1/4 promotes cancer cell growth. These fusions can arise via complex rearrangement chains called chromoplexy.

Dietary
Plant-based diets are associated with a lower risk for prostate cancer. Switching to a plant-based diet shows favorable results for cancer outcomes in men with prostate cancer. Especially vegan diets consistently show favorable associations with prostate cancer risk and outcomes.

Consuming fruits and vegetables has been found to be of little preventive benefit. Some studies report that higher meat consumption was associated with higher risk.

The consumption of milk may be related to prostate cancer. A 2020 systematic review found the results on milk consumption and prostate cancer inconclusive but stated that individuals with higher risk may reduce or eliminate milk. A 2019 overview stated that the evidence that linked milk to higher rates of prostate cancer was inconsistent and inconclusive. A 2021 study from Japan looking at 26,464 men found that milk consumption increased the risk of prostate cancer by 37%.

Lower blood levels of vitamin D may increase risks. One study found no effect of folic acid supplements on risk.

Medication exposure
Some links have been established between prostate cancer and medications, medical procedures, and medical conditions. Statins may also decrease risk.

Infection
Prostatitis (infection or inflammation) may increase risk. In particular, infection with the sexually transmitted infections Chlamydia, gonorrhea, or syphilis seems to increase risk.

Papilloma virus has been proposed to have a potential role, but as of 2015, the evidence was inconclusive; as of 2018, the increased risk was debated.

Environment
US war veterans who had been exposed to Agent Orange had a 48% increased risk of prostate cancer recurrence following surgery.

Sex 
Although some evidence from prospective cohort studies indicates that frequent ejaculation may reduce prostate cancer risk, no randomized controlled trials reported this benefit. An association between vasectomy and prostate cancer was found, but causality has not been established.

Pathophysiology

The prostate is part of the male reproductive system that helps make and store seminal fluid. In adult men, a typical prostate is about 3 cm long and weighs about 20 g. It is located in the pelvis, under the urinary bladder and in front of the rectum. The prostate surrounds part of the urethra, the tube that carries urine from the bladder during urination and semen during ejaculation. The prostate contains many small glands, which make about 20% of the fluid constituting semen.

Superiorly, the prostate base is contiguous with the bladder outlet. Inferiorly, the prostate's apex heads in the direction of the urogenital diaphragm, which is pointed anterio-inferiorly. The prostate can be divided into four anatomic spaces: peripheral, central, transitional, and anterior fibromuscular stroma. The peripheral space contains the posterior and lateral portions of the prostate, as well as the inferior portions of the prostate. The central space contains the superior portion of the prostate including the most proximal aspects of the urethra and bladder neck. The transitional space is located just anterior to the central space and includes urethra distal to the central gland urethra. The neurovascular bundles course along the posterolateral prostate surface and penetrate the prostatic capsule there as well.

Most of the glandular tissue is found in the peripheral and central zones (peripheral zone: 70-80% of glandular tissue; central zone: 20% of glandular tissue). Some is found in the transitional space (5% of glandular tissue). Thus, most cancers that develop from glandular tissue are found in the peripheral and central spaces, while about 5% is found in the transitional space. None is found in the anterior fibromuscular stroma since no glands are in that anatomic space.

The prostate glands require male hormones, known as androgens, to work properly. Androgens include testosterone, which is made in the testes;dehydroepiandrosterone, made in the adrenal glands; and dihydrotestosterone, which is converted from testosterone within the prostate itself. Androgens are also responsible for secondary sex characteristics such as facial hair and increased muscle mass.

Because of the prostate's location, prostate diseases often affect urination, ejaculation, and rarely defecation. In prostate cancer, the cells of these glands mutate into cancer cells.

Most prostate cancers are classified as adenocarcinomas, or glandular cancers, that begin when semen-secreting gland cells mutate into cancer cells. The region of the prostate gland where the adenocarcinoma is most common is the peripheral zone. Initially, small clumps of cancer cells remain within otherwise normal prostate glands, a condition known as carcinoma in situ or prostatic intraepithelial neoplasia (PIN). Although no proof establishes that PIN is a cancer precursor, it is closely associated with cancer. Over time, these cells multiply and spread to the surrounding prostate tissue (the stroma) forming a tumor.

Eventually, the tumor may grow large enough to invade nearby organs such as the seminal vesicles or the rectum, or tumor cells may develop the ability to travel in the bloodstream and lymphatic system.

Prostate cancer is considered a malignant tumor because it can invade other areas of the body. This invasion is called metastasis. Prostate cancer most commonly metastasizes to the bones and lymph nodes, and may invade the rectum, bladder, and lower ureters after local progression. The route of metastasis to bone is thought to be venous, as the prostatic venous plexus draining the prostate connects with the vertebral veins.

The prostate is a zinc-accumulating, citrate-producing organ. Transport protein ZIP1 is responsible for the transport of zinc into prostate cells. One of zinc's important roles is to change the cell's metabolism to produce citrate, an important semen component. The process of zinc accumulation, alteration of metabolism, and citrate production is energy inefficient, and prostate cells require enormous amounts of energy (ATP) to accomplish this task. Prostate cancer cells are generally devoid of zinc. Prostate cancer cells save energy by not making citrate, and use the conserved energy to grow, reproduce and spread.

The absence of zinc is thought to occur via silencing the gene that produces ZIP1. It is called a tumor suppressor gene product for the gene SLC39A1. The cause of the epigenetic silencing is unknown. Strategies that transport zinc into transformed prostate cells effectively eliminate these cells in animals. Zinc inhibits NF-κB pathways, is antiproliferative, and induces apoptosis in abnormal cells. Unfortunately, oral ingestion of zinc is ineffective since high concentrations of zinc into prostate cells is not possible without ZIP1.

Loss of cancer suppressor genes, early in prostatic carcinogenesis, have been localized to chromosomes 8p, 10q, 13q, and 16q. P53 mutations in the primary prostate cancer are relatively low and are more frequently seen in metastatic settings, hence, p53 mutations are a late event in the pathology. Other tumor suppressor genes that are thought to play a role include PTEN and KAI1. "Up to 70 percent of men with prostate cancer have lost one copy of the PTEN gene at the time of diagnosis". Relative frequency of loss of E-cadherin and CD44 has also been observed. Loss of the retinoblastoma (RB) protein induces androgen receptor deregulation in castration-resistant prostate cancer by deregulating 'E2F1 expression.

The factors that drive disease progression and clinical prognosis remain only partly understood but a variety of molecular determinants has been identified that appear to be involved. The most important of these might be the tyrosine phosphatase ACP1 of which the expression might outperform the Gleason grading system for predicting disease course. Other molecules identified include the transcription factor RUNX2 which may prevent cancer cells from undergoing apoptosis, the PI3k/Akt signaling cascade in conjunction with the transforming growth factor beta/SMAD signaling cascade that also protect against apoptosis. Pim-1 is upregulated in prostate cancer. X-linked inhibitor of apoptosis (XIAP) is hypothesized to promote cancer cell survival and growth, the Macrophage inhibitory cytokine-1 (MIC-1) that stimulates the focal adhesion kinase (FAK) signaling pathway. Nevertheless, it is fair to say that the molecular factors that determine why some patients have quiescent disease while otherdisplay prognosis remain largely obscure.

The androgen receptor helps cancer cells to survive. Prostate-specific membrane antigen (PSMA) stimulates cancer development by increasing folate levels, helping the cancer cells to survive and grow; it increases available folates for use by hydrolyzing glutamated folates.

Diagnosis

The American Cancer Society's position regarding early detection by PSA testing is:

Several other tests can be used to gather information about the prostate and the urinary tract. Digital rectal examination may allow a doctor to detect prostate abnormalities. Cystoscopy shows the urinary tract from inside the bladder, using a thin, flexible camera tube inserted in the urethra. Transrectal ultrasonography creates a picture of the prostate using sound waves from a probe in the rectum, but the only test that can fully confirm the diagnosis of prostate cancer is a biopsy, the removal of small pieces of the prostate for microscopic examination.

Imaging

Ultrasound and magnetic resonance imaging (MRI) are the two main imaging methods used for prostate cancer detection.

MRI

Appearance of prostate on MRI 
On MRI, the central and transitional zones both have lower T2 signal than the peripheral zone. Since the central and transitional zones cannot be distinguished from each other, they can be best described as the central gland on MRI. Thus, the peripheral gland has a higher signal on T2WI than the central gland. In the peripheral gland, prostate cancer appears as a low-intensity lesion. However, in the central gland, low-intensity lesions cannot be distinguished from the low-intensity central gland. Diffusion restriction is instrumental in identifying and characterizing central gland lesions. Combined diffusion-weighted (DW) imaging and dynamic contrast-enhanced MRI for distinguish malignant from benign prostate lesions can be used. The merged  images,  of  DW  and  MRI  with  dynamic  contrast  enhancement, can  visualise areas with low signal intensity and fast wash-out effect - characteristic of carcinomas. Lymphadenopathy can be seen best on postcontrast, fat-suppressed T1WI. Other regions can be described on MRI. The anterior fibromuscular stroma and the prostate capsule along the posterior and lateral prostate have a low T2WI signal, in contrast with the bright signal of the peripheral zone. Extraprostatic extension can be seen with disruption of capsule integrity.

MRI for the detection of prostate cancer 
As of 2011, MRI was used to identify targets for prostate biopsy using fusion MRI with ultrasound (US) or MRI-guidance alone. An MRI alone will correctly identify 91% of men with clinically significant prostate cancer but will misclassify 63% of men at risk for prostate cancer as having clinically significant prostate cancer. An MRI-targeted biopsy will correctly identify 80% of men with prostate cancer. However, it will classify 6% of men at risk for prostate cancer as having clinically significant prostate cancer. Detection of clinically insignificant cancer has been shown to be decreased when MRI-targeted biopsy is combined with standard biopsy for men with positive results on MRI, as compared with a standard biopsy method.

Following an MRI, regions of interest within the scan which may be cancer are often graded on a likelihood scale between 1 and 5. One such scale is the prostate imaging-reporting and data system (PI-RADS) scale which defines standards of clinical service for multiparametric MRI (mpMRI), including image creation and reporting. PI-RADS version 2 scoring has shown a specificity and sensitivity of 73% and 95%, respectively, for detection of prostate cancer.

When an MRI is used to decide whether to do a biopsy in men who have had a prior biopsy, it is 5% more likely to make a correct diagnosis than a standard biopsy and is 12% more likely to be correct for men who may or may not have had a prior biopsy. In men who have had a negative biopsy, this combination is 44% more likely to lead to a correct diagnosis.

Other uses for MRI 
Prostate MRI is also used for surgical planning for robotic prostatectomy. It helps surgeons decide whether to resect or spare the neurovascular bundle, determine return to urinary continence, and help assess surgical difficulty. MRI is used in other types of treatment planning, for both focal therapy and radiotherapy. MRI can also be used to target areas for research sampling in biobanking.

Biological basis for prostate cancer visibility on MRI 
The biological properties which determine whether or not a tumour is visible on MRI is poorly understood. One theory is that tumour cells undergo several genetic changes during transformation which alter the cellular rate of growth and formation of new blood vessels, leading to tumours with more aggressive histological patterns, hypoxic regions and increased cell density among other features. Having larger, more dense tumours with changes in blood vessel distributions may feasibly alter signal on MRI through restriction of water and/or fluid movement.

Some studies have linked the presence of rare histological patterns within the tumour such as cribriform pattern. Although recent research suggests there is a number of histopathological features which may influence tumour detection by MRI. At a genetic level, prostate cancer visibility on MRI seems to be linked with genetic features of aggressive disease including processes such as cell proliferation, tumour hypoxia and DNA damage.  The gene changes consistently observed in MRI-visible tumours include loss of tumour suppressor PTEN, increased expression of proliferation associated genes CENPF, AGR2 and growth factor GDF15 as well as a number of other genes. Changes in these pathways and genes may facilitate increased tumour growth, changes in vasculature and density which ultimately change the signal on MRI.

Ultrasound 
Ultrasound imaging can be obtained transrectally and is used during prostate biopsies. Prostate cancer can be seen as a hypoechoic lesion in 60% of cases. The other 40% of cancerous lesions are either hyperechoic or isoechoic. On Color Doppler, the lesions appear hypervascular.

PET 
A PSMA scan is a positron emission tomography (PET) imaging technique which targets the overexpression of PSMA in prostate cancer tissue. A range of radiopharmaceuticals have been developed, with more under active research.
Gallium-68 (68Ga) PSMA-11 and fluorine-18 (18F) PSMA-DCFPyL received FDA approval for PET-CT imaging in prostate cancer in 2021. It has a role in evaluation of prostate cancer patients, especially patients who may go on to receive lutetium-177 (177Lu) PSMA radioligand therapy.

Biopsy

If cancer is suspected, a biopsy is offered expediently. During a biopsy, a urologist or radiologist obtains tissue samples from the prostate via either the rectum or the perineum. A biopsy gun inserts and removes special hollow-core needles (usually three to six on each side of the prostate) in less than a second. Prostate biopsies are routinely done on an outpatient basis and rarely require hospitalization. Systematic biopsies correctly identify 63% of men as having clinically significant prostate cancer but will miss the rest. For men at risk for prostate cancer, biopsy will not misclassify any of the men as having clinically significant prostate cancer.

Antibiotics should be used to prevent complications such as fever, urinary tract infections, and sepsis even if the most appropriate course or dose is undefined. About 55% of men report discomfort during prostate biopsy.

Histopathologic diagnosis

A histopathologic diagnosis mainly includes assessment of whether a cancer exists, as well as any subdiagnosis, if possible. Histopathologic subdiagnosis has implications for the possibility and methodology of Gleason scoring. The most common histopathological subdiagnosis is acinar adenocarcinoma, constituting 93% of diagnoses. The most common form of acinar adenocarcinoma, in turn, is "adenocarcinoma, not otherwise specified", also termed conventional, or usual acinar adenocarcinoma.

Biochemical diagnosis
Alkaline phosphatase is more elevated in metastatic than non-metastatic cells. High levels of alkaline phosphatase is associated with a significant decrease in survival.

Gleason score

The Gleason grading system is used to help evaluate the prognosis and helps guide therapy. A Gleason score is based upon the tumor's appearance. Cancers with a higher Gleason score are more aggressive and have a worse prognosis. Pathological scores range from 2 through 10, with a higher number indicating greater risks and higher mortality.

ISUP score 
In 2014, the International Society of Urological Pathology (ISUP) provided a new prostate cancer grading system called the ISUP scores.

Tumor markers
Tissue samples can be stained for the presence of PSA and other tumor markers to determine the origin of malignant cells that have metastasized.

Small cell carcinoma is a rare (1%) type that cannot be diagnosed using PSA.  researchers were investigating ways to screen for this type, because it is quick to metastasize.

The oncoprotein BCL-2 is associated with the development of androgen-independent prostate cancer, due to its high levels of expression in androgen-independent tumours in advanced stages. The upregulation of BCL-2 after androgen ablation in prostate carcinoma cell lines and in a castrated-male rat model further established a connection between BCL-2 expression and prostate cancer progression.

Staging

An important part of evaluating prostate cancer is determining the stage, or degree of spread. Knowing the stage helps define prognosis and is useful when selecting therapies. The most common system is the four-stage TNM system (abbreviated from tumor/nodes/metastases). Its components include the size of the tumor, the number of involved lymph nodes, and the presence of any other metastases. In the United Kingdom the Cambridge Prognostic Group (CPG) is used for categorising prostate cancer into 5 risk groups (CPG1 to CPG5).

The most important distinction made by any staging system is whether the cancer is confined to the prostate. In the TNM system, clinical T1 and T2 cancers are found only in the prostate, while T3 and T4 cancers have metastasized. Several tests can be used to look for evidence of spread. Medical specialty professional organizations recommend against the use of PET scans, CT scans, or bone scans when a physician stages early prostate cancer with low risk for metastasis. Those tests would be appropriate in cases such as when a CT scan evaluates spread within the pelvis, a bone scan looks for spread to the bones, and endorectal coil magnetic resonance imaging evaluates the prostatic capsule and the seminal vesicles. Bone scans should reveal osteoblastic appearance due to increased bone density in the areas of bone metastasis—the reverse of what is found in many other metastatic cancers. Approved radiopharmaceutical diagnostic agents used in PET: fluciclovine (2016), Ga 68 PSMA-11 (2020), piflufolastat (2021).

After a biopsy, a pathologist examines the samples under a microscope. If cancer is present, the pathologist reports the grade of the tumor. The grade tells how much the tumor tissue differs from normal prostate tissue and suggests how fast the tumor is likely to grow. The pathologist assigns a Gleason number from 1 to 5 for the most common pattern observed under the microscope, then does the same for the second-most common pattern. The sum of these two numbers is the Gleason score. The Whitmore-Jewett stage is another method.

In men with high-risk localised prostate cancer, staging with PSMA PET/CT may be appropriate to detect nodal or distant metastatic spread. In 2020, a randomised phase 3 trial compared Gallium-68 PSMA PET/CT to standard imaging (CT and bone scan). It reported superior accuracy of Gallium-68 PSMA-11 PET/CT (92% vs 65%), higher significant change in management (28% vs 15%), less equivocal/uncertain imaging findings (7% vs 23%) and lower radiation exposure (10 msV vs 19 mSv). The study concluded that PSMA PET/CT is a suitable replacement for conventional imaging.

Prevention

Diet and lifestyle
The data on the relationship between diet and prostate cancer are poor. However, the rate of prostate cancer is linked to the consumption of the Western diet. Little if any evidence associates trans fat, saturated fat, and carbohydrate intake and prostate cancer. Evidence does not support  a role for omega-3 fatty acids in preventing prostate cancer. Vitamin supplements appear to have no effect and some may increase the risk. High supplemental calcium intake has been linked to advanced prostate cancer.

Fish may lower prostate-cancer deaths, but does not appear to affect occurrence. Some evidence supports lower rates of prostate cancer with a vegetarian diet, lycopene, selenium cruciferous vegetables, soy, beans and/or other legumes.

Regular exercise may slightly lower risk, especially vigorous activity.

Medications
In those who are regularly screened, 5-alpha-reductase inhibitors (finasteride and dutasteride) reduce the overall risk of prostate cancer. Data are insufficient to determine if they affect fatality risk and they may increase the chance of more serious cases.

Screening

Prostate cancer screening searches for cancers in those without symptoms. Options include the digital rectal exam and the PSA blood test. Such screening is controversial, and for many, may lead to unnecessary disruption and possibly harmful consequences. Harms of population-based screening, primarily due to overdiagnosis (the detection of latent cancers that would have otherwise not been discovered) may outweigh the benefits. Others recommend shared decision-making, an approach where screening may occur after a physician consultation.

The United States Preventive Services Task Force (USPSTF) suggests the decision whether to have PSA screening be based on consultation with a physician for men 55 to 69 years of age. USPSTF recommends against PSA screening after age 70. The Centers for Disease Control and Prevention endorsed USPSTF's conclusion. The American Society of Clinical Oncology and the American College of Physicians discourage screening for those who are expected to live less than 10–15 years, while those with a greater life expectancy a decision should individually balance the potential risks and benefits. In general, they concluded, "it is uncertain whether the benefits associated with PSA testing for prostate cancer screening are worth the harms associated with screening and subsequent unnecessary treatment."

American Urological Association (AUA 2013) guidelines call for weighing the uncertain benefits of screening against the known harms associated with diagnostic tests and treatment. The AUA recommends that shared decision-making should control screening for those 55 to 69, and that screening should occur no more often than every two years. In the United Kingdom as of 2018, no program existed to screen for prostate cancer.

Management

The first decision is whether treatment is needed. Low-grade forms found in elderly men often grow so slowly that treatment is not required. Treatment may be inappropriate if a person has other serious health problems or is not expected to live long enough for symptoms to appear. Approaches in which treatment is postponed are termed "expectant management". Expectant management is divided into two approaches: Watchful waiting, which has palliative intent (aims to treat symptoms only), and active surveillance, which has curative intent (aims to prevent the cancer from advancing).

Which option is best depends on disease stage, the Gleason score, and the PSA level. Other important factors are age, general health and a person's views about potential treatments and their possible side effects. Because most treatments can have significant side effects, such as erectile dysfunction and urinary incontinence, treatment discussions often focus on balancing the goals of therapy with the risks of lifestyle alterations. A 2017 review found that more research focused on person-centered outcomes is needed to guide patients. A combination of treatment options is often recommended.

Guidelines for specific clinical situations require estimation of life expectancy. As average life expectancy increases due to advances in the treatment of other diseases, more patients will live long enough for their prostate cancer to express symptoms. An 18-item questionnaire was proposed to learn whether patients have adequate knowledge and understanding of their treatment options. In one 2015 study, most of those who were newly diagnosed correctly answered fewer than half of the questions.

The widespread use of PSA screening in the US has resulted in diagnosis at earlier age and cancer stage, but almost all cases are still diagnosed after age 65, while about 25% are diagnosed after age 75. Though US National Comprehensive Cancer Network guidelines recommend using life expectancy to help make treatment decisions, in practice, many elderly patients are not offered curative treatment options such as radical prostatectomy or radiation therapy and are instead treated with hormonal therapy or watchful waiting.

Surveillance

Many men diagnosed with low-risk prostate cancer are eligible for active surveillance. The tumor is carefully observed over time, with the intention of initiating treatment if signs of progression appear. Active surveillance is not synonymous with watchful waiting, a term which implies no treatment or specific program of monitoring, with the assumption that only palliative treatment would be used if advanced, symptomatic disease develops.

Active surveillance involves monitoring the tumor for growth or symptoms, which trigger treatment. The monitoring process may involve PSA tests, digital rectal examination, or repeated biopsies every few months. The goal of active surveillance is to postpone treatment, and avoid overtreatment and its side effects, given a slow-growing or self-limited tumor that in most people is unlikely to cause problems. This approach is not used for aggressive cancers, and may cause anxiety for people who wrongly believe that all cancers are deadly or that their condition is life-threatening. Between 50 and 75% of patients die from other causes without experiencing prostate symptoms.  In localized disease, based on long-term follow-up, radical prostatectomy results in significantly improved oncological outcomes when compared with watchful waiting.  Prostatectomy is associated with increased rates of urinary incontinence and erectile dysfunction, but these findings are based primarily on men diagnosed before widespread PSA screening and cannot be highly generalized. When compared to active monitoring/surveillance, on follow-up at ten years, radical prostatectomy probably has similar outcomes for disease-specific survival and probably reduces risk of disease progression and spreading.  Urinary and sexual function are probably decreased in patients treated with radical prostatectomy.

Active treatment
Both surgical and nonsurgical treatments are available, but treatment can be difficult, and combinations can be used. Treatment by external beam radiation therapy, brachytherapy, cryosurgery, high-intensity focused ultrasound, and prostatectomy are, in general, offered to men whose cancer remains within the prostate. Hormonal therapy and chemotherapy are often reserved for metastatic disease. Exceptions include local or metastasis-directed therapy with radiation may be used for advanced tumors with limited metastasis. Hormonal therapy is used for some early-stage tumors. Cryotherapy (the process of freezing the tumor), hormonal therapy, and chemotherapy may be offered if initial treatment fails and the cancer progresses. Sipuleucel-T, a cancer vaccine, was reported to offer a four-month increase in survival in metastatic prostate cancer, but the marketing authorisation for it was withdrawn on 19 May 2015.

If radiation therapy fails, radical prostatectomy may be an option, though it is a technically challenging surgery. However, radiation therapy after surgical failure may have many complications. It is associated with a small increase in bladder and colon cancer. Radiotherapy and surgery appear to result in similar outcomes with respect to bowel, erectile and urinary function after five years.

Nonsurgical treatment 
Non-surgical treatment may involve radiation therapy, chemotherapy, hormonal therapy, external beam radiation therapy, and particle therapy, high-intensity focused ultrasound, or some combination.

Prostate cancer that persists when testosterone levels are lowered by hormonal therapy is called castrate-resistant prostate cancer (CRPC). Many early-stage cancers need normal levels of testosterone to grow, but CRPC does not. Previously considered "hormone-refractory prostate cancer" or "androgen-independent prostate cancer", the term CRPC emerged because these cancers show reliance upon hormones, particularly testosterone, for androgen receptor activation.

The cancer chemotherapeutic docetaxel has been used as treatment for CRPC with a median survival benefit of 2 to 3 months. A second-line chemotherapy treatment is cabazitaxel. A combination of bevacizumab, docetaxel, thalidomide and prednisone appears effective in the treatment of CRPC.

Immunotherapy treatment with sipuleucel-T in CRPC appeared to increase survival by four months. However, marketing authorisation for sipuleucel-T was withdrawn on 19 May 2015. The second line hormonal therapy abiraterone increases survival by about 4.6 months. Enzalutamide is another second line hormonal agent with a five-month survival advantage. Both abiraterone and enzalutamide are currently in clinical trials in those with CRPC who have not previously received chemotherapy.

Not all patients respond to androgen signaling-blocking drugs. Certain cells with characteristics resembling stem cells remain unaffected. Therefore, the desire to improve CRPC outcomes resulted in increasing doses or combination therapy with synergistic androgen-signaling blocking agents. But even these combination will not affect stem-like cells that do not exhibit androgen signaling.

For patients with metastatic prostate cancer that has spread to their bones, doctors use a variety of bone-modifying agents to prevent skeletal complications and support the formation of new bone mass. Zoledronic acid (a bisphosphonate) and denosumab (a RANK-ligand-inhibitor) appear to be effective agents, but are associated with more frequent and serious adverse events.

Surgery 
Radical prostatectomy is considered the mainstay of surgical treatment of prostate cancer, where the surgeon removes the prostate, seminal vesicles, and surrounding lymph nodes. It can be done by an open technique (a skin incision at the lower abdomen), or laparoscopically. Radical retropubic prostatectomy is the most commonly used open surgical technique. Robotic-assisted prostatectomy has become common. Men with localized prostate cancer, having laparoscopic radical prostatectomy or robotic-assisted radical prostatectomy, might have shorter stays in the hospital and get fewer blood transfusions than men undergoing open radical prostatectomy. How these treatments compare with regard to overall survival or recurrence-free survival is unknown.

Transurethral resection of the prostate  is the standard surgical treatment for benign enlargement of the prostate. In prostate cancer, this procedure can be used to relieve symptoms of urinary retention caused by a large prostate tumor, but it is not used to treat the cancer itself. The procedure is done under spinal anesthesia, a resectoscope is inserted inside the penis and the extra prostatic tissue is cut to clear the way for the urine to pass.

Complications 
The two main complications encountered after prostatectomy and prostate radiotherapy are erectile dysfunction and urinary incontinence, mainly stress-type. Most men regain continence within 6 to 12 months after the operation, so doctors usually wait at least one year before resorting to invasive treatments.

Stress urinary incontinence usually happens after prostate surgery or radiation therapy due to factors that include damage to the urethral sphincter or surrounding tissue and nerves. The prostate surrounds the urethra, a muscular tube that closes the urinary bladder. Any of the mentioned reasons can lead to incompetent closure of the urethra and hence incontinence. Initial therapy includes bladder training, lifestyle changes, kegel exercises, and the use of incontinence pads. More invasive surgical treatment can include the insertion of a urethral sling or an artificial urinary sphincter, which is a mechanical device that mimics the function of the urethral sphincter, and is activated manually by the patient through a switch implanted in the scrotum. The latter is considered the gold standard in patients with moderate or severe stress urinary incontinence.

Erectile dysfunction happens in different degrees in nearly all men who undergo prostate cancer treatment, including radiotherapy or surgery; however, within one year, most of them will notice improvement. If nerves were damaged, this progress may not take place. Pharmacological treatment includes PDE-5 inhibitors such as viagra or cialis, or injectable intracavernous drugs injected directly into the penis (prostaglandin E1 and vasoactive drug mixtures). Other nonpharmacological therapy includes vacuum constriction devices and penile implants.

Psychological 
Psychological interventions such as psychoeducation, cognitive behavioural therapy (CBT) and mindfulness are recommended for the management of mental and emotional complications of disease symptoms and those associated with active treatment. Due to limited research and inadequate methodological rigor of published literature, solid recommendations cannot be made on the effectiveness of mindfulness in men with prostate cancer.

Prognosis
Many prostate cancers are not destined to be lethal, and most men will ultimately not die as a result of the disease. Mortality varies widely across geography and other elements. In the United States, five-year survival rates range from 29% (distant metastases) to 100% (local or regional tumors). In Japan, the fatality rate rose to 8.6/100,000 in 2000. In India in the 1990s, half of those diagnosed with local cancer died within 19 years. One study reported that African-Americans have 50–60 times more deaths than found in Shanghai, China. In Nigeria, 2% of men develop prostate cancer, and 64% of them are dead after 2 years. Most Nigerian men present with metastatic disease with a typical survival of 40 months.

In patients who undergo treatment, the most important clinical prognostic indicators of disease outcome are the stage, pretherapy PSA level, and Gleason score. The higher the grade and the stage, the poorer the prognosis. Nomograms can be used to calculate the estimated risk of the individual patient. The predictions are based on the experience of large groups of patients. A complicating factor is that the majority of patients have multiple independent tumor foci upon diagnosis, and these foci have independent genetic changes and molecular features. Because of this extensive inter-focal heterogeneity, it is a risk that the prognostication is set based on the wrong tumor focus.

An important aspect of decision making on the value of treatment is how to balance prognosis from prostate cancer with other causes of mortality and the morbidity of treatment. The PREDICT Prostate algorithm (https://prostate.predict.nhs.uk) is a multivariable prognostic model that provides individualised cancer-specific and overall long-term survival estimates in early stage non-metastatic PCa patients. In addition to the use of routinely available preoperative clinical-pathological variables such as PSA, biopsy Gleason score (ISUP grade group), and clinical T-stage, the PREDICT Prostate tool also includes the impact of patient characteristics (age and comorbidity status) and radical treatment (radical prostatectomy or radiotherapy) on survival. The tool provides patients with estimated survival rates after treatment in the context of absolute mortality rate, which allows patients to make an informed decision as to the value of treatment and its potential side effects. Thurtle et al. performed an external validation of their previously published PREDICT Prostate model. The tool outperformed other widely used models and was proven to have high c-indices for all-cause and PCa-specific mortality, and the model calibration was good and remained accurate within the treatment subgroups. Recent work has also shown that it significantly alters clinician treatment recommendations and improves patients confidence in decision making and in their understanding of mortality risks from a new prostate cancer diagnosis  Predict Prostate is endorsed for use as a decision aid for prostate cancer by the UK National Institute for Health and Care Excellence 

Androgen ablation therapy causes remission in 80–90% of patients undergoing therapy, resulting in a median progression-free survival of 12 to 33 months. After remission, an androgen-independent phenotype typically emerges, wherein the median overall survival is 23–37 months from the time of initiation of androgen ablation therapy. How androgen-independence is established and how it re-establishes progression is unclear.

Classification systems

Several tools are available to help predict outcomes, such as pathologic stage and recurrence after surgery or radiation therapy. Most combine stage, grade, and PSA level, and some include the number or percentage of biopsy cores positive, age, and/or other information.

The D'Amico classification stratifies men by low, intermediate, or high risk based on stage, grade and PSA. It is used widely in clinical practice and research settings. The major downside to the three-level system is that it does not account for multiple adverse parameters (e.g., high Gleason score and high PSA) in stratifying patients.
The Partin tables predict pathologic outcomes (margin status, extraprostatic extension, and seminal vesicle invasion) based on the same three variables and are published as lookup tables.
The Kattan nomograms predict recurrence after surgery and/or radiation therapy, based on data available at the time of diagnosis or after surgery. The Kattan score represents the likelihood of remaining free of disease at a given time interval following treatment.
The UCSF Cancer of the Prostate Risk Assessment (CAPRA) score predicts both pathologic status and recurrence after surgery. It offers accuracy comparable to the Kattan preoperative nomogram and can be calculated without tables or a calculator. Points are assigned based on PSA, grade, stage, age, and percentage of cores positive; the sum yields a 0–10 score, with every two points representing roughly a doubling of risk of recurrence. The CAPRA score was derived from community-based data in the CaPSURE database. It has been validated among over 10,000 prostatectomy patients, including patients from CaPSURE; the SEARCH registry, representing data from several Veterans Health Administration and military medical centers; a multi-institutional cohort in Germany; and the prostatectomy cohort at Johns Hopkins University. More recently, it has been shown to predict metastasis and mortality following prostatectomy, radiation therapy, watchful waiting, or androgen deprivation therapy.
 The UK National Institute for Health and Care Excellence guidelines recommends use of the Cambridge Prognostic Groups (CPG) 5-tier model when determining treatment options. The rationale for the change related to recent evidence, which suggests that 5-tier risk stratification model was better at predicting prostate cancer specific mortality than older 3-tier models  The CPG model has been tested and validated in studies including >80,000 men  The NICE CPG model and treatment recommendations can be viewed at the NICE guideline website.

Life expectancy
Life expectancy projections are averages for an entire male population, and many medical and lifestyle factors modify these numbers. For example, studies have shown that a 40-year-old man will lose 3.1 years of life if he is overweight (BMI 25–29) and 5.8 years of life if he is obese (BMI 30 or more), compared to men of normal weight. If he is both overweight and a smoker, he will lose 6.7 years, and if obese and a smoker, he will lose 13.7 years.

No evidence shows that either surgery or beam radiation has an advantage over the other in this regard. The lower death rates reported with surgery appear to occur because surgery is more likely to be offered to younger men with less severe cancers. Insufficient information is available to determine whether seed radiation extends life more readily than the other treatments, but data so far do not suggest that it does.

Men with low-grade disease (Gleason 2–4) were unlikely to die of prostate cancer within 15 years of diagnosis. Older men (age 70–75) with low-grade disease had a roughly 20% overall survival at 15 years due to deaths from competing causes. Men with high-grade disease (Gleason 8–10) experienced high mortality within 15 years of diagnosis, regardless of their age.

Epidemiology

As of 2012, prostate cancer is the second-most frequently diagnosed cancer (at 15% of all male cancers) and the sixth leading cause of cancer death in males worldwide. In 2010, prostate cancer resulted in 256,000 deaths, up from 156,000 deaths in 1990. Rates of prostate cancer vary widely. Rates vary widely between countries. It is least common in South and East Asia, and more common in Europe, North America, Australia, and New Zealand. Prostate cancer is least common among Asian men and most common among black men, with white men in between.

The average annual incidence rate of prostate cancer between 1988 and 1992 among Chinese men in the United States was 15 times higher than that of their counterparts living in Shanghai and Tianjin, but these high rates may be affected by higher rates of detection. Many suggest that prostate cancer may be under-reported, yet benign prostatic hyperplasia incidence in China and Japan is similar to rates in Western countries.

More than 80% of men develop prostate cancer by age 80.

United States

Prostate cancer is the third-leading cause of cancer death in men, exceeded by lung cancer and colorectal cancer. It accounts for 19% of all male cancers and 9% of male cancer-related deaths.

Cases ranged from an estimated 230,000 in 2005 to an estimated 164,690 In 2018.

Deaths held steady around 30,000 in 2005 and 29,430 in 2018.

Age-adjusted incidence rates increased steadily from 1975 through 1992, with particularly dramatic increases associated with the spread of PSA screening in the late 1980s, later followed by a fall in incidence. A decline in early-stage incidence rates from 2011 to 2012 (19%) in men aged 50 years and older persisted through 2013 (6%).

Declines in mortality rates in certain jurisdictions may reflect the interaction of PSA screening and improved treatment. The estimated lifetime risk is about 14.0%, and the lifetime mortality risk is 2.6%.

Between 2005 and 2011, the proportion of disease diagnosed at a locoregional stage was 93% for whites and 92% for African Americans; the proportion of disease diagnosed at a late stage was 4% for European Americans and 5% for African Americans.

Prostate cancer is more common in the African American population than the European American population. An autopsy study of White and Asian men also found an increase in occult prostate cancer with age, reaching nearly 60% in men older than 80 years. More than 50% of cancers in Asian men and 25% of cancers in White men had a Gleason score of 7 or greater, suggesting that Gleason score may be an imprecise indicator of clinically insignificant cases.

Canada 
Prostate cancer is the third-leading type of cancer in Canadian men. In 2016, around 4,000 died and 21,600 men were diagnosed with prostate cancer.

Europe
In Europe in 2012, it was the third-most diagnosed cancer after breast and colorectal cancers at 417,000 cases.

In the United Kingdom, it is the second-most common cause of cancer death after lung cancer, where around 35,000 cases are diagnosed every year, of which around 10,000 are fatal.

History
The prostate was first described by Venetian anatomist Niccolò Massa in 1536, and illustrated by Flemish anatomist Andreas Vesalius in 1538. Prostate cancer was identified in 1853. It was initially considered a rare disease, probably because of shorter life expectancies and poorer detection methods in the 19th century. The first treatments were surgeries to relieve urinary obstruction.

Removal of the gland was first described in 1851, and radical perineal prostatectomy was first performed in 1904 by Hugh H. Young at Johns Hopkins Hospital.

Surgical removal of the testes (orchiectomy) to treat prostate cancer was first performed in the 1890s, with limited success. Transurethral resection of the prostate (TURP) replaced radical prostatectomy for symptomatic relief of obstruction in the middle of the 20th century because it could better preserve penile erectile function. Radical retropubic prostatectomy was developed in 1983 by Patrick Walsh. This surgical approach allowed for removal of the prostate and lymph nodes with maintenance of penile function.

In 1941, Charles B. Huggins published studies in which he used estrogen to oppose testosterone production in men with metastatic prostate cancer. This discovery of "chemical castration" won Huggins the 1966 Nobel Prize in Physiology or Medicine. The role of the gonadotropin-releasing hormone (GnRH) in reproduction was determined by Andrzej W. Schally and Roger Guillemin, who shared the 1977 Nobel Prize in Physiology or Medicine for this work. GnRH receptor agonists, such as leuprorelin and goserelin, were subsequently developed and used to treat prostate cancer.

Radiation therapy for prostate cancer was first developed in the early 20th century and initially consisted of intraprostatic radium implants. External beam radiotherapy became more popular as stronger [X-ray] radiation sources became available in the middle of the 20th century. Brachytherapy with implanted seeds (for prostate cancer) was first described in 1983.

Systemic chemotherapy for prostate cancer was first studied in the 1970s. The initial regimen of cyclophosphamide and 5-fluorouracil was quickly joined by regimens using other systemic chemotherapy drugs.

Enzalutamide gained FDA approval in 2012 for the treatment of castration-resistant prostate cancer (CRPC). Alpharadin won FDA approval in 2013, under the priority review program.

In 2006, a previously unknown retrovirus, Xenotropic MuLV-related virus (XMRV), was associated with human prostate tumors, but PLOS Pathogens retracted the article in 2012.

Society and culture
Men with prostate cancer generally encounter significant disparities in awareness, funding, media coverage, and research—and therefore, inferior treatment and poorer outcomes—compared to other cancers of equal prevalence. In 2001, The Guardian noted that Britain had 3,000 nurses specializing in breast cancer, compared to a single nurse for prostate cancer. Waiting time between referral and diagnosis was two weeks for breast cancer but three months for prostate cancer.

A 2007 report by the U.S.-based National Prostate Cancer Coalition stated that prostate cancer drugs were outnumbered seven to one by breast cancer drugs. The Times also noted an "anti-male bias in cancer funding" with a four-to-one discrepancy in the United Kingdom by both the government and by cancer charities such as Cancer Research UK. Critics cite such figures when claiming that women's health is favored over men's health.

Disparities extend into detection, with governments failing to fund or mandate prostate cancer screening while fully supporting breast cancer programs. For example, a 2007 report found 49 U.S. states mandate insurance coverage for routine breast cancer screening, compared to 28 for prostate cancer.

Prostate cancer experiences significantly less media coverage than other, equally prevalent cancers, outcovered 2.6:1 by breast cancer.

Prostate Cancer Awareness Month takes place in September in a number of countries. A light blue ribbon is used to promote the cause.

Research

Castration-resistant prostate cancer 
Castration-resitant prostate cancer is prostate cancer that progresses despite androgen depletion therapy.

Enzalutamide is a nonsteroidal antiandrogen (NSAA). It has been used with abiraterone in studies involving Whole genome sequencing that have shown how androgen receptors acquire resistance to them, which determines the use of new therapies against this pathology such as degraders of the protein or of the N-terminal domain of this receptor. This has been seen thanks to the sequencing of circulating tumor DNA in patients.

Alpharadin uses bone targeted Radium-223 isotopes to kill cancer cells by alpha radiation. 

PARP inhibitor olaparib is an approved breast/ovarian cancer drug that is undergoing clinical trials. Also in trials for CRPC are : checkpoint inhibitor ipilimumab, CYP17 inhibitor galeterone (TOK-001), and immunotherapy PROSTVAC.

All medications for CRPC block androgen receptor (AR) signaling via direct or indirect targeting of the AR ligand binding domain (LBD). AR belongs to the steroid nuclear receptor family. Development of the prostate is dependent on androgen signaling mediated through AR, and AR is also important for disease progression. Molecules that could successfully target alternative domains have emerged. Such therapies could provide an advantage; particularly in treating prostate cancers that are resistant to current therapies.

Evolution 
Sequencing techniques, in addition to reflecting the mechanisms of resistance to treatment, through the circulating tumor DNA, distinguish between the evolutionary history of this cancer when it metastasizes and the temporal subclonal dynamics, determining how the tumor is found when it is diagnosed.

Pre-clinical
Arachidonate 5-lipoxygenase has been identified as playing a significant role in the survival of prostate cancer cells. Medications that target this enzyme are undergoing development. In particular, arachidonate 5-lipoxygenase inhibitors produce massive, rapid programmed cell death in prostate cancer cells.

Galectin-3 is another potential target. Aberrant glycan profiles have been described in prostate cancer, and studies have found specific links between the galectin signature and prostate cancer.

The PIM kinase family is another potential target for selective inhibition. A number of related drugs are under development. It has been suggested the most promising approach may be to co-target this family with other pathways including PI3K.

Cancer models
Scientists have established prostate cancer cell lines to investigate disease progression. LNCaP, PC-3 (PC3), and DU-145 (DU145) are commonly used prostate cancer cell lines. The LNCaP cancer cell line was established from a human lymph node metastatic lesion of prostatic adenocarcinoma. PC-3 and DU-145 cells were established from human prostatic adenocarcinoma metastatic to bone and to brain, respectively. LNCaP cells express AR, but PC-3 and DU-145 cells express very little or no AR.

The proliferation of LNCaP cells is androgen-dependent but the proliferation of PC-3 and DU-145 cells is androgen-insensitive. Elevation of AR expression is often observed in advanced prostate tumors in patients. Some androgen-independent LNCaP sublines have been developed from the ATCC androgen-dependent LNCaP cells after androgen deprivation for study of prostate cancer progression. These androgen-independent LNCaP cells have elevated AR expression and express prostate specific antigen upon androgen treatment. Paradoxically, androgens inhibit the proliferation of these androgen-independent prostate cancer cells.

Diagnosis
One active research area and non-clinically applied investigations involves non-invasive methods of tumor detection. A molecular test that detects the presence of cell-associated PCA3 mRNA in fluid obtained from the prostate and first-void urine sample is under investigation. PCA3 mRNA is expressed almost exclusively by prostate cells and has been shown to be highly over-expressed in prostate cancer cells. The test result is currently reported as a specimen ratio of PCA3 mRNA to PSA mRNA.

The PCA3 test attempts to help decide whether, in men suspected of having prostate cancer (especially if an initial biopsy fails to explain the elevated serum PSA), a biopsy/rebiopsy is needed. The higher the expression of PCA3 in the sample, the greater the likelihood of a positive biopsy. The CDC's Evaluation of Genomic Applications in Practice and Prevention Working Group discourages clinical use.

See also 
Prostate Cancer Foundation
Testicular cancer

References

External links 

 
Patient-centered information from the European Urological Association
 

 
Male genital neoplasia
Neoplastic and hyperplastic prostate disorders
Histopathology
Infectious causes of cancer
Wikipedia medicine articles ready to translate